Seth Burkholder (born December 17, 1982) is a former American football placekicker.

Burkholder attended Bluffton High School, in Bluffton, Ohio, where he was a member of the football team. After his senior season, he moved on to Bluffton University where he didn't play his freshman and sophomore years. In 2004, Burkholder became the starting kicker for the Beavers. Burkholder went on to start for two outstanding seasons at Bluffton, being named to 3 All-HCAC teams, and once a National Soccer Coaches Association of America's Adidas All-Great Lakes Region player.

After a great collegiate career, Burkholder played professionally with Canton Cougars and the Marion Blue Racers. After a few games with Marion, Burkholder was signed by the Pittsburgh Power. After a single game with the Power, Burkholder was placed on suspension.

College career

Bluffton University
Burkholder attended Bluffton University, in Bluffton, Ohio, where he played as a member of the football team on scholarship. He was once named the NCAA Division 3 Player of the Week after a performance against Anderson University in which he made a 39-yard field goal. He also punted the ball seven times for 287 total yards for an average of 41.0 yards per punt, pinning the Ravens three times within their own 20-yard line. For his career, Burkholder still holds the 6th best punting average (36.1), 5th in career punts (113), 6th in kicker scoring (85), 6th in PAT's made (50) and 2nd in PAT percentage (.909) He also places on several single season records as well.

Professional career

Canton Cougars
Upon attending the Ultimate Indoor Football League's combine in 2010, Burkholder was drafted 4th overall by the Canton Cougars in the UIFL's Draft.

Marion Blue Racers
In 2012, Burkholder signed to play with the Marion Blue Racers of the United Indoor Football League.

Pittsburgh Power
On May 11, 2012, Burkholder was assigned to the Pittsburgh Power of the Arena Football League. Burkholder appeared in just one game with the Power, not attempting any field goals, and going 0 for 3 in PAT attempts. He was reassigned on May 14, 2012, and then suspended on May 15.

References

1982 births
Living people
American football placekickers
Bluffton Beavers football players
Canton Cougars players
Marion Blue Racers players
Pittsburgh Power players
People from Bluffton, Ohio
People from Putnam County, Ohio
Players of American football from Ohio